Farshad Noor (born 2 October 1994) is an Afghan professional footballer who plays as a midfielder for I-League club Gokulam Kerala and captains the Afghanistan national team.

Youth career
Noor joined the PSV Youth Academy in the 2004–05 season.

Club career

PSV
Noor signed his first professional contract with PSV on 15 February 2013. Noor made his debut for Jong PSV in the Eerste Divisie against Sparta Rotterdam on 3 August 2013. He scored his first goal against FC Den Bosch on 20 September 2013. After making 66 appearances and scoring 3 goals he left PSV for Roda JC.

Roda JC
On 7 August 2015 Noor signed a one-year contract with Roda JC. After signing with Roda JC Noor was one of the better players in the first half of the season. He showed his skills with outstanding performance against Heracles Almelo in his debut with an assist and starting the first four games without being substituted. After a good first half of the season Noor got injured. On 19 May 2016 Roda JC extended his contract until the summer of 2017. After a good first year Noor didn't play much in the first half of the 2016–17 season. Eventually Roda JC and Noor decided to search for a new club on loan or a transfer to get more playtime.

SC Cambuur
On 19 January 2017 Roda JC announced on their website that Noor was loaned to SC Cambuur until the summer of 2017. He made his debut against his former team Jong PSV and made an assist in a 2–0 win.

AFC Eskilstuna
On 28 July 2017, Noor signed a six-month contract with Swedish club AFC Eskilstuna. He made his competitive debut for the club on 13 August 2017 in a 1–1 away draw with AIK. He was subbed on for Omar Eddahri in the 61st minute.

Nea Salamis
In January 2018, Noor signed for Nea Salamis in the Cypriot First Division. He made his league debut for the club on 21 January 2018 in a 3–0 home victory over Pafos FC. He was subbed on for Alastair Reynolds in the 67th minute. He scored his first league goal for the club as part of a brace on 10 March 2018 in a 6–2 away victory over Doxa. He scored in the 58th and 84th minutes.

Persib Bandung

He signed to Persib Bandung in march 2021.

Gokulam Kerala
In October 2022, Noor signed with I-League defending champions Gokulam Kerala.

International career

Netherlands
Noor made his debut for the Netherlands U17 in a friendly match against Italy U17.

Afghanistan
Noor was invited for the provisional squad for the training camp in Doha, Qatar. Noor made his debut for Afghanistan in a friendly 2–1 win over Singapore on 23 March 2017. Noor made his official debut against Vietnam in a 2019 AFC Asian Cup qualification match.

Personal life 
Noor was born in Mazar-i-Sharif, Afghanistan. When he was 5 years old his parents fled the country because of the war in Afghanistan. They currently live in Best, Netherlands.

Career statistics

Club

International

International goals
Scores and results list Afghanistan's goal tally first.

References

External links
 Voetbal International profile 

1994 births
Living people
Sportspeople from Mazar-i-Sharif
People from Best, Netherlands
Footballers from North Brabant
Afghan footballers
Afghanistan international footballers
Afghan expatriate footballers
Dutch footballers
Netherlands youth international footballers
Dutch people of Afghan descent
Eredivisie players
Eerste Divisie players
Allsvenskan players
Cypriot First Division players
PSV Eindhoven players
Roda JC Kerkrade players
SC Cambuur players
AFC Eskilstuna players
Nea Salamis Famagusta FC players
Expatriate footballers in Sweden
Expatriate footballers in Cyprus
Expatriate footballers in Indonesia
Expatriate footballers in Bahrain
Association football midfielders
Dutch expatriate footballers
Dutch expatriate sportspeople in Cyprus
Dutch expatriate sportspeople in Sweden
Dutch expatriate sportspeople in Indonesia
Dutch expatriate sportspeople in Bahrain
Afghan expatriate sportspeople in Cyprus
Afghan expatriate sportspeople in Sweden
Afghan expatriate sportspeople in Indonesia
Afghan expatriate sportspeople in Bahrain
Gokulam Kerala FC players